Between the Canals is an Irish crime film written and directed by Mark O'Connor.

Plot
The film follows three small-time criminals as they pinball their way about Dublin on a boozy Saint Patrick's Day. Liam (Dan Hyland) is plotting an escape from minor villainy. Dave (Peter Coonan) hopes to move up the criminal pecking order, while Scratcher (Stephen Jones) seems happy to coast.

Cast
 Peter Coonan as Dave Fennel
 Dan Hyland as Liam Mulligan
 Stephen Jones as Scratcher
 Damien Dempsey as Paul Chambers
 Peter Coonan as Dave Fennell - Dots
 Barry Keoghan	as Aido

Production
The film was shot in a speedy, mobile style around Sheriff Street, Dublin.

Release
The film premiered at the Jameson Dublin International Film Festival on 24 February 2010. It was released in Irish cinemas on 18 March 2011.

Reception
The film has received strongly positive reviews. The Irish Times stated "Inner-city Dublin has often been the subject of Irish films, but few previous releases have got so close to the exhaust fumes, car alarms and fag ash." Entertainment.ie called it "a rough-and-ready drama that's a cross between Mean Streets and La Haine."

References

External links
 
 

2010 films
Irish crime films
2010 crime films
English-language Irish films
Films set in Dublin (city)
Saint Patrick's Day films
2010s English-language films